Melvin Leroy Branch (February 15, 1937 – April 21, 1992) was a college and professional American football defensive end for the Dallas Texans/Kansas City Chiefs and the Miami Dolphins in the American Football League (AFL).

He was a member of the "Chinese Bandits" defense for the national championship winning 1958 LSU Tigers football team, and a starter for the Texans in their victory over the Houston Oilers in the longest professional football game played up to that time, the 1962 AFL Championship Game.

See also
List of American Football League players

External links

1937 births
1992 deaths
American football defensive ends
People from Leesville, Louisiana
Players of American football from Louisiana
LSU Tigers football players
Dallas Texans (AFL) players
Kansas City Chiefs players
Miami Dolphins players
American Football League All-Star players
American Football League All-League players
People from DeRidder, Louisiana
American Football League players